"Out At Sea" is a song performed by Belgian singer-songwriter Tom Dice, released as the second single from his second studio album Heart for Sale. It was released on 4 May 2012 as a digital download in Belgium on iTunes. The song was written by Jeroen Swinnen, Tom Dice and Dazzled Kid.

Track listing

Credits and personnel
 Lead vocals – Tom Dice
 Record producers – Jeroen Swinnen
 Lyrics – Jeroen Swinnen, Tom Dice, Dazzled Kid
 Label: SonicAngel

Chart performance

Weekly charts

Release history

References

2012 singles
Tom Dice songs
Songs written by Tom Dice
2012 songs
Songs written by Jeroen Swinnen